Jian Xin is a Singaporean Buddhist nun and founder of Miao Xin Vihara.

Biography
Jian Xin became involved with Buddhism at the age of 15, when she made the resolve to follow the bodhisattva path.

She graduated from the National University of Singapore and pursued further studies at Yuan Kuang Buddhist Institute in Taiwan. She obtained a master's degree in Buddhist Studies from the SOAS University of London.

References

Date of birth missing (living people)
Living people
Singaporean Buddhist nuns
Singaporean social workers
21st-century Buddhist nuns
Year of birth missing (living people)